The 2017 Internazionali di Tennis Castel del Monte was a professional tennis tournament played on indoor carpet courts. It was the fifth edition of the tournament which was part of the 2017 ATP Challenger Tour. It took place in Andria, Italy between November 20 and November 26, 2017.

Singles main-draw entrants

Seeds

 1 Rankings are as of 13 November 2017.

Other entrants
The following players received wildcards into the singles main draw:
  Filippo Baldi
  Enrico Dalla Valle
  Andrea Pellegrino

The following player received entry into the singles main draw using a protected ranking:
  Igor Sijsling

The following players received entry from the qualifying draw:
  Gianluca Di Nicola
  Christopher Heyman
  Constant Lestienne
  Andrea Vavassori

The following player received entry as a lucky loser:
  Denis Matsukevich

Champions

Singles

 Uladzimir Ignatik def.  Christopher Heyman 6–7(3–7), 6–4, 7–6(7–3).

Doubles

 Lorenzo Sonego /  Andrea Vavassori def.  Sander Arends /  Sander Gillé 6–3, 3–6, [10–7].

References

2017 ATP Challenger Tour
2017
2017 in Italian tennis